The 1895–96 season was Swindon Town's second season in the Southern League, the club's first season within a league structure. Swindon also competed in the FA Cup.

Division One

Results and matchday squads

Southern League Division One line-ups

FA Cup line-ups

External links
Extensive Swindon Town statistics site

1895-96
Swindon Town